The 1969 Army Cadets football team represented the United States Military Academy in the 1969 NCAA University Division football season. Led by head coach Tom Cahill, the team finished with a record of 4–5–1. The Cadets offense scored 161 points, while the defense allowed 160 points.

Schedule

Personnel

Season
In 1969, Notre Dame and Army reprised their long series at Yankee Stadium.  Games were played from 1925 to 1946 except 1930.

Navy

References

Army
Army Black Knights football seasons
Army Cadets football